Gnathoenia schoutedeni is a species of beetle in the family Cerambycidae. It was described by Breuning in 1935. It is known from the Democratic Republic of the Congo.

References

Ceroplesini
Beetles described in 1935
Endemic fauna of the Democratic Republic of the Congo